The name Fitow has been used to name three tropical cyclones in the northwestern Pacific Ocean. The name was contributed by the Federated States of Micronesia and is the name of a flower in the Yapese language.
 Tropical Storm Fitow (2001) (T0114, 18W) – struck Hainan island and mainland China, killing 4.
 Typhoon Fitow (2007) (T0709, 10W) – struck Japan, killing at least 2.
 Typhoon Fitow (2013) (T1323, 22W, Quedan) – damaging typhoon that struck China at Fuding in Fujian province. 

The name Fitow was retired after the 2013 season, and replaced with Mun in the 2019 Pacific typhoon season, which refers to Yapese for the month of June.

Pacific typhoon set index articles